Joseph Chrest (born September 15, 1965) is an American academic and actor. He has had roles in numerous films and television shows including 21 Jump Street, 22 Jump Street, Oldboy, Lee Daniels' The Butler, The Perfect Date, and as Ted Wheeler in Stranger Things.

Early life and education
Chrest was born and raised in St. Albans, West Virginia, where he attended St. Albans High School. In the late 1980s, he earned his master's degree in acting from Louisiana State University in Baton Rouge, Louisiana.

Career
Chrest is also an adjunct professor at the School of Theatre in Louisiana State University's College of Music & Dramatic Arts. He teaches a film acting class. Since 1992, he is a founding member of LSU's Swine Palace.

Filmography

Film

Television

References

External links

Stranger Things at LSU: Interview with Professor Joe Chrest, 26 October 2017.

Living people
Louisiana State University faculty
Male actors from West Virginia
Marshall University alumni
People from St. Albans, West Virginia
1965 births